Master of Engineering Management (MEM) (or Master of Science in Engineering Management (MSEM)) is a professional master's degree that bridges the gap between the field of engineering or technology and the field of business management. Engineering management is a multidisciplinary field that seeks to address problems associated with complex engineering operations or systems along with the business. MEM or MSEM graduate programs are grounded in principles such as data analytics, machine learning, product management, product design, operations, and supply chain management. Harvard Business Review found that in 2018 more of the top-performing 100 global CEOs have engineering degrees than have MBAs.

Courses
Core courses that make up a MEM program can be found in an MBA program as well; courses such as Marketing, Intellectual Property, Business Law, Finance, Accounting and Management are examples of courses that are utilized within both an MBA program and a MEM program. The focus of students engaged in a Master of Business Administration graduate program is business-centric: teaching students how to make informed decisions that would impact business (large and small), but with little or no emphasis on the technological aspects of the business.  

The primary objective of the Master of Engineering Management is to interweave the business and technology curriculum together so that students of this program can learn to leverage both domains when making data-driven decisions that would impact the business comprehensively. While MBA and MEM programs share some similarities in shaping capable leaders through a core curriculum in economics, marketing, and operations, students with MEM degrees are a better fit for today’s technology companies simply because an undergraduate degree in a STEM field is a prerequisite for admission. Since it’s not a prerequisite for an MBA, a majority of candidates graduate with a non-technical education. In a world where technology touches almost all aspects of life and business, students with a MEM degree fit seamlessly into today’s high-tech companies that need tech-savvy leaders for data-driven decision making and innovation-driven global strategy and growth.

Accreditation 

Until recently, there has not been an extensive amount of collaboration among different colleges and universities. However, that has begun to change with two major accreditation bodies that have sought to bring rigor and structure to the Engineering Management graduate degree programs: American Society of Engineering Management (ASEM), and Master of Engineering Management Programs Consortium (MEMPC).

American Society of Engineering Management (ASEM) 
ASEM states that "program is designed to provide recognition to those programs that excel in offering education at the Master’s level that meet the rigorous standards of ASEM. It also provides an excellent mechanism to assess the state of an existing Master’s program relative to ASEM standards and is especially useful for new Master’s programs just getting started."

Master of Engineering Management Programs Consortium (MEMPC) 
The Master of Engineering Management Programs Consortium (MEMPC) is a dedicated group of forward-thinking universities working together to promote engineering management programs to students and organizations.

Based on US News University Rankings 2022, the national rankings for these universities in the consortium are as follows:

 Massachusetts Institute of Technology - 2nd
 Johns Hopkins University - 7th
 Duke University - 10th

 Northwestern University - 10th
 Dartmouth College - 12th

 Cornell University - 17th

 University of Southern California - 25th
 Tufts University - 32nd
 Purdue University - 51st

References

External links
 Master of Engineering Management Consortium
 University of Windsor Master of Engineering Management Program
 Tsinghua University International Master of Engineering Management Program

Engineering Management, Master of Science
Business qualifications